Lashley may refer to:

Persons
Bobby Lashley (1976–), American professional wrestler and mixed martial artist
Karl Lashley (1890–1958), American psychologist and behaviorist
Nick Lashley, American Guitarist
Peter Lashley (1937–), Barbadian cricketer
Sylvan A. Lashley, former president of the Atlantic Union College

Place Names
Lashley, town in Houston County, Georgia, USA
Lashley, town in Fulton County, Pennsylvania, USA

Disambiguation pages with surname-holder lists